The 18th Space Defense Squadron (18 SDS) is a United States Space Force Space Domain Awareness unit located at Vandenberg Space Force Base, California. The 18th SDS is tasked with executing command and control of the space surveillance network (SSN), maintaining the resident space object (RSO) database and managing United States Space Command's space situational awareness (SSA) sharing program to United States, foreign government, commercial, and academic entities. The squadron also conducts advanced analysis, sensor optimization, conjunction assessment, human spaceflight support, reentry/break-up assessment, and launch analysis.

Mission
The mission of the 18th SDS is to provide and advance a continuous, comprehensive, and combat-relevant understanding of the space situation.

The squadron processes SSN data to monitor all activity to, in, and from space, and maintains custody of all resident space objects. Primary mission functions include launch detection and tracking, conjunction assessment and collision avoidance, human spaceflight support, maneuver detection, breakup identification, and reentry assessment. These functions ultimately enhance an information advantage and enable space superiority in the defense of U.S. and allied interests. Additionally, the 18 SDS also executes U.S. Space Command’s Space Situational Awareness sharing program, which provides tracking data of resident space objects to DoD, interagency, commercial, international and academic partners to:

 Promote peaceful and responsible use of space by tracking more than 45,000 man-made objects and sharing space data with the world
 Reduce uncertainty in space domain to minimize risk of misunderstanding and miscalculations

History
The 18th Space Surveillance Squadron (SPSS) was the optical portion of the United States Space Force's Space Surveillance Network. They were responsible for operating four worldwide GEODSS sites, in addition to the Transportable Optical System (TOS), and the Maui Space Surveillance Complex (MSSC).  The focal point for all optical command and control was centralized at the Optical Command, Control and Communications Facility (OC3F). The 18 SPSS became part of the 1st Space Wing, Air Force Space Command, on 1 February 1990.

The unit was reassigned from the 1st Space Wing to the 73d Space Group on 15 May 1992.

The 18th SPSS relocated to Edwards Air Force Base, California in July 1995. The 73rd Space Group was inactivated in May 1995 and all units were then assigned to the 21st Space Wing.  With a force-wide renaming of space units, the 18th SPSS became the 18th Space Control Squadron (18 SPCS) in February 2003.  This renaming did not last long, however, since the unit was inactivated in June 2004, with all detachments falling under the 21st Operations Group.

From 2004 to 2016, the space surveillance mission was executed by other USAF organizations located at Cheyenne Mountain Space Force Station in Colorado, and within the Combined Space Operations Center in California.

On 22 July 2016, the 18th Space Control Squadron was reactivated at Vandenberg Air Force Base. The squadron had a mission focused on space situational awareness in support of launches, object and debris tracking, and human spaceflight.

On 13 April 2022, the 18th Space Control Squadron was redesignated as the 18th Space Defense Squadron.  The change was to signify the squadron’s focus on the increasingly congested and contested space domain and their critical role in providing data and information to ensure the safety, security, and sustainability of the space environment.

List of commanders
Lt Col T. Simpson
Lt Col Scott G. Putnam, 22 July 2016 – July 2017
Lt Col Mia Walsh, July 2017 – 18 June 2019
Lt Col Justin Sorice, 18 June 2019 – ~June 2021
Lt Col Matthew Lintker, June 2021 – present

Assignments

Combatant Command 

 United States Space Command (29 August 2019 – present)

Field Command 

 Space Operations Command (21 October 2020 – present)

Delta 

 Space Delta 2 (24 July 2022 – present)

Major Command
 Air Defense Command (later Aerospace Defense Command), 1 November 1966-1 October 1975
Air Force Space Command (1 February 1990 – 2004)

Numbered Air Force
 Fourteenth Aerospace Force (later Fourteenth Air Force, 1 February 1990 – 2004

Wing/Group
 73d Space Group (1 July 1991 – 2004)
 21st Space Wing
21st Operations Group

Detachments
 18 SPCS, Detachment 1 – Dahlgren, Virginia
 18 SPSS, Detachment 1 – Socorro, New Mexico
 18 SPSS, Detachment 2 – Diego Garcia, British Indian Ocean Territories
 18 SPSS, Detachment 3 – Maui, Hawaii
 18 SPSS, Detachment 4 – Morón Air Base, Spain June 1997 – June 2004

Lineage
 Constituted as the 18th Surveillance Squadron and activated on 1 November 1966 (not organized)
 Organized on 1 January 1967
 Inactivated on 1 October 1975
 Activated on 1 February 1990
 Redesignated 18th Space Surveillance Squadron on 15 May 1992
 Redesignated 18th Space Control Squadron on 1March 2003
 Inactivated on 1 July 2004
 Activated on 22 July 2016

Stations
 Edwards Air Force Base, California, 1 January 1967 – 1 October 1975
 Peterson Air Force Base, Colorado, 1 February 1990 – 1 November 1994
 Edwards AFB, California, 1 November 1994 – 1 July 2004
 Vandenberg Air Force Base (later Vandenberg Space Force Base), California,  22 July 2016 – present

Equipment Operated
 Ground-based Electro Optical Deep Space Surveillance System (February 1990 – 2004)
Baker-Nunn satellite tracking cameras (January 1967-October 1975)

Decorations
  Air Force Outstanding Unit Award
 8 July 1970 – 7 July 1971
 [1 Feb 1990]-31 Aug 1991
18 October 1995 – 30 September 1997
1 October 1997 – 30 September 1999
1 January 1998 – 31 December 1998
1 January 1999 – 31 December 1999
1 January 2000 – 31 August 2001

References

Notes
 Explanatory Notes

 Citations

Bibliography

External links

Squadrons of the United States Space Force
Military units and formations in California